Brigadier Sir Otho Leslie Prior-Palmer, DSO (28 October 1897 – 29 January 1986) was an Anglo-Irish British Army officer and Conservative Party politician. He served for nearly twenty years as a Member of Parliament for Worthing. His main contributions were on the subject of defence, on which he was sometimes roused to outspoken criticism of the opposition Labour Party.

Early career
Prior-Palmer was born in Dublin, Ireland, where his father, Spunner Prior-Palmer, was a landowner in County Sligo. He was sent to Wellington College for his schooling, and joined the British Army immediately on leaving school. In 1916 he was commissioned into the 9th Lancers. He trained at the Royal Military College, Sandhurst. Later his younger brother George Erroll Prior-Palmer followed him through Wellington and Sandhurst into the same regiment.

Recreations and family
During the inter-war period, Prior-Palmer took an interest in equestrianism while continuing in service with the Lancers. He owned a stud which bred horses for the Warwickshire Hounds, although he sometimes had to sell up when his leave was cancelled and he was posted abroad. He also enjoyed sailing in the late 1920s, and was a member of the Royal Yacht Squadron.

In July 1926 Prior-Palmer married Hon. Barbara Frankland. His interest in horses was also manifest in horse racing: he was at first a jockey. In the Sandown Park Grand Military Gold Cup of 1932, he rode "Master of Orange" and led in the early stages, before coming in second at the finish. Later he was an active trainer of race horses.

In March 1936, Prior-Palmer was promoted major. However, he sued for and was granted a divorce in 1936 on the grounds of his wife's adultery with Edward Agar, 5th Earl of Normanton, whom she subsequently married. On 11 May 1940 Prior-Palmer took as his second wife, Sheila Weller-Poley. His second wife was to be active in politics later as a Conservative and as Chairman of West Sussex County Council Education Committee.

Second World War
During the Second World War, Prior-Palmer was placed in command of the 2nd Northamptonshire Yeomanry in 1940. In March 1942, he was transferred to command the 30th Armoured Brigade, and in August he moved to the 29th Armoured Brigade; both of these units were stationed in Britain. In 1943 Prior-Palmer was put in command of the 7th Armoured Brigade in Italy; this involved heavy fighting. In October 1944 his brigade made a particularly effective contribution to fighting around the Savio River. In 1945 he was awarded the Distinguished Service Order.

Political career
At the 1945 general election, Prior-Palmer was selected as the Conservative Party candidate for Worthing, a new constituency which had been created in boundary changes just before the election. He was placed on retired pay by the army in 1946 with the honorary rank of brigadier.

In parliament, Prior-Palmer began his career by voting (along with many backbench Conservative MPs) against the large loan from the United States that the Labour government had negotiated after the end of Lend-Lease. However, these were the only dissenting votes he ever cast against the Conservative whip. In 1946 he argued for retaining conventional defence in addition to nuclear arms, because an answer would be found to the atomic bomb.

With an interest in army training and the cadet services, in May 1947 Prior-Palmer moved a new clause to the National Service Bill which would give an incentive to those who were called up for National Service after achieving a level of efficiency in the cadets. In March 1948 he went on a Parliamentary delegation to East Africa (Kenya, Uganda, Tanganyika and Zanzibar). Later that year he warned of the danger of invasion of the United Kingdom by air, and urged the creation of a force to tackle it.

His constituency was safely Conservative and Prior-Palmer had a majority of over 21,000 in the 1951 general election. In the first month of the new Parliament, with a Conservative government once again, he was required to apologise after being overheard saying that the Labour frontbencher and former Minister Jim Griffiths "had never done a damned day's work in his life". In May 1953 he launched a debate on the need for voluntary defence services. In September 1954 he was named on a delegation to visit the Soviet Union.

Prior-Palmer supported abolition of capital punishment in an unwhipped House of Commons vote in February 1956, one of only 48 Conservative MPs to do so. He backed the Eden government on Suez, arguing that it took British and French intervention to get a United Nations force to come in. Having served as chair of the Conservative Backbenchers' Army sub-committee for most of the 1950s, he was made vice-chairman of the Defence Committee from 1958.

Knighted in 1959, Prior-Palmer was regarded as an 'elder statesman' but could still be angered by pacifist sentiment. In February 1960 he claimed that the Labour Party had "sent one of their chief leaders to Swaythling to stop men making Spitfires". Despite uproar among Labour MPs present, he refused to withdraw. In February 1961, Prior-Palmer signed, but later withdrew his name from, a motion critical of the constitutional development of Northern Rhodesia.

Retirement
On 7 November 1963, Prior-Palmer announced that owing to "personal reasons and reasons of ill-health", he would not be a candidate at the next general election. He had in the meantime become involved in business in the field of commercial radio, as an investor. In 1964 he divorced his second wife and married his third, Elizabeth Henderson. They had two sons in the mid-1960s.

References

Sources
M. Stenton and S. Lees, "Who's Who of British MPs" Vol. IV (Harvester Press, 1981)
"Who Was Who", A & C Black
Thepeerage.com

External links

Generals of World War II

Conservative Party (UK) MPs for English constituencies
Graduates of the Royal Military College, Sandhurst
UK MPs 1945–1950
UK MPs 1950–1951
UK MPs 1951–1955
UK MPs 1955–1959
UK MPs 1959–1964
9th Queen's Royal Lancers officers
People educated at Wellington College, Berkshire
Knights Bachelor
Companions of the Distinguished Service Order
1897 births
1986 deaths
Northamptonshire Yeomanry officers
Politicians awarded knighthoods
British Army personnel of World War II
British Army personnel of World War I
Military personnel from Dublin (city)